The Cendere Çayı, formerly the Bölam Su, is a right tributary of Kâhta Çayı in Adıyaman Province, Turkey.

A major Roman bridge, the Severan Bridge, crosses it. The Latin inscription on the bridge calls the river Chabina(s).

Notes

Rivers of Turkey
Landforms of Adıyaman Province